An election for President of Israel was held in the Knesset on 26 March 1968. Zalman Shazar, who was elected in 1963 following the death of Yitzhak Ben-Zvi, ran unopposed for the position. Shazar's second term began on the day of the election. He would hold this position until 1973, when Ephraim Katzir was elected as the new President.

Results

References

President
Single-candidate elections
Presidential elections in Israel
Israel